Minalungao National Park is a protected area of the Philippines located in the municipality of General Tinio, Nueva Ecija in Central Luzon. The park covers an area of 2,018 hectares centered along the scenic Peñaranda River bordered on both sides by up to 16-meter high limestone walls in the foothills of the Sierra Madre mountain range. It was established in 1967 by virtue of Republic Act No. 5100.

The park is considered one of the few remaining natural environments in this region north of Manila. It is promoted by the local government as an ecotourism destination offering breath-taking scenery of green pristine river and unique rock formations. A system of unexplored caverns have also been identified as potential attractions. Facilities for picnics, swimming, fishing, raft riding and cliff diving have likewise been put up to draw more visitors.

See also
List of national parks of the Philippines

References

External links

National parks of the Philippines
Protected areas established in 1967
1967 establishments in the Philippines
Geography of Nueva Ecija
Tourist attractions in Nueva Ecija